Sinthaweechai Hathairattanakool (born March 23, 1982 as Kosin Hathairattanakool), simply known as Tee is a Thai professional footballer who plays as a goalkeeper for Thai League 1 club Police Tero and the Thailand national team.

Club career
Born in Sakon Nakhon Province, Sinthaweechai spent his youth career with Assumption Sriracha School between 1999 and 2002. The young goalkeeper signed his first professional contract with a Thai Premier League club TTM Phichit (now TTM Chiangmai) in 2002, he spent 2 seasons with the club and won a league title in 2004-2005 season.

The former Thailand U23 international joined Osotsapa in 2005 before moving abroad to an Indonesian club, Persib Bandung in 2006.

In 2007, Sinthaweechai returned to Thailand, joined his local club Chonburi and won the league title with The Sharks. Sinthaweechai also won Kor Royal Cup with the club in the next season, but failed to protect their league title from PEA. He also participated in the AFC Champions League with Chonburi in 2008 but the club were knocked out in the group stage.

The Thai goalkeeper rejoined Persib Bandung on a season loan in 2009.

After the loan spell with the Indonesian, Sinthaweechai returned to Chonburi and has been playing for the club regularly.

In December 2015 it was announced that Sinthaweechai would be joining Suphanburi for the 2016 season. The deal, which costs 15 million Thai bahts broke the record as the most expensive domestic transfer in Thai football history.

International career

Sinthaweechai has been serving the country in almost every level; U17, U19, U23 and senior squad respectively. He was first called up for the U19 team between 2000-2001 but did not make much of recognition.

It was between 2002-2005 that the goalkeeper started to become public interest. He was called up for Thailand U23 in 2002 and since the U23 team participate many more competitions than the lower level, practically part of senior squad, he was given more chances and eventually earned no.1 status in the team.

He made totally 22 appearances for the U23 team between 2002-2005.

Sinthaweechai was promoted to the senior squad in 2004. However, he lost his no.1 status in numerous occasions as well, as he underperformed in matches. Sinthaweechai was also a member of the victorious T&T Cup 2008 winning squad. Anyway, under the management of Winfried Schafer, which was appointed as Thailand's head coach in July, 2011, Sinthaweechai firmly regained his first team regular in Thailand national team so far, especially in 2014 Asian World Cup Qualifying section which he earned many positive comments from the media and fans regarded to his performances against Australia.

He was part of Winfried Schäfer's 2012 AFF Suzuki Cup, but didn't play in the tournament because he got a fever. Sinthaweechai played a friendly match against China, and he was captain in that match.

In 2013, he was called up to the national team by Surachai Jaturapattarapong to the 2015 AFC Asian Cup qualification, he was chosen by the coach as captain. In October, 2013 Sinthaweechai started out as a captain for Thailand against Bahrain, in a friendly match. On October 15, 2013 he captained Thailand against Iran national football team in the 2015 AFC Asian Cup qualification.

In May 2015, he played for Thailand in the 2018 FIFA World Cup qualification (AFC) against Vietnam, he also kept a clean sheet in the following game.

On 5 September 2017, Sinthaweechai announced his early retirement from international football after the match with Australia in 2018 FIFA World Cup qualification – AFC Third Round. On 14 October 2018, Football Association of Thailand organised Sinthaweechai Testimonial Match with Trinidad and Tobago national football team at Suphan Buri Provincial Stadium, as part of FIFA Friendly schedule and ended with score 1–0 win for the Thais over Trinidad and Tobago, ending his national career covering 14 years and 79 match appearances.

Honours

Club
Chonburi
 Thai Premier League (1): 2007
 Kor Royal Cup (4): 2008, 2011, 2012

International
Thailand U-23
 Sea Games  Gold Medal (1) ; 2003, 2005

Thailand
 ASEAN Football Championship (1): 2016
 VFF Cup : 2008
 King's Cup (1): 2017

Individual
 Thai Premier League Goalkeeper of the Year (1): 2008
 Thai Premier League Player of the Month (1): July 2014
 Thai Premier League Player of the Year (1): 2011

References

External links
 
 Profile at Goal

1982 births
Living people
Sinthaweechai Hathairattanakool
Sinthaweechai Hathairattanakool
Sinthaweechai Hathairattanakool
Association football goalkeepers
Sinthaweechai Hathairattanakool
Sinthaweechai Hathairattanakool
Persib Bandung players
Sinthaweechai Hathairattanakool
Sinthaweechai Hathairattanakool
Sinthaweechai Hathairattanakool
Sinthaweechai Hathairattanakool
Liga 1 (Indonesia) players
Sinthaweechai Hathairattanakool
Thai expatriate sportspeople in Indonesia
Expatriate footballers in Indonesia
Sinthaweechai Hathairattanakool
Sinthaweechai Hathairattanakool
2004 AFC Asian Cup players
2007 AFC Asian Cup players
Footballers at the 2006 Asian Games
Sinthaweechai Hathairattanakool
Southeast Asian Games medalists in football
Competitors at the 2003 Southeast Asian Games
Competitors at the 2005 Southeast Asian Games
Sinthaweechai Hathairattanakool
Sinthaweechai Hathairattanakool